Falsomesosella is a genus of longhorn beetles of the subfamily Lamiinae, containing the following species:

subgenus Falsomesosella
 Falsomesosella affinis Breuning, 1938
 Falsomesosella albofasciata Pic, 1925
 Falsomesosella andamanica Breuning, 1936
 Falsomesosella annamensis Breuning, 1939
 Falsomesosella basigranulata Breuning, 1968
 Falsomesosella bifasciata Breuning, 1938
 Falsomesosella breuningi Pic, 1944
 Falsomesosella ceylonica Breuning, 1974
 Falsomesosella densepunctata Breuning, 1968
 Falsomesosella elongata Breuning, 1938
 Falsomesosella gardneri Breuning, 1938
 Falsomesosella glacilior (Bates, 1884)
 Falsomesosella grisella (White, 1858)
 Falsomesosella grisescens Breuning, 1939
 Falsomesosella horishana Gressitt, 1938
 Falsomesosella javanica Breuning, 1956
 Falsomesosella mediofasciata Breuning, 1968
 Falsomesosella minor Pic, 1925
 Falsomesosella nigronotata Pic, 1930
 Falsomesosella nilghirica Breuning, 1936
 Falsomesosella obliquevittata Breuning, 1938
 Falsomesosella ochreomarmorata Breuning, 1968
 Falsomesosella parvula Breuning, 1938
 Falsomesosella robusta Pic, 1944
 Falsomesosella rufovittata Breuning, 1938
 Falsomesosella subalba Gressitt, 1938
 Falsomesosella subunicolor Breuning, 1969
 Falsomesosella theresae Pic, 1945
 Falsomesosella transversefasciata Breuning, 1938
 Falsomesosella truncatipennis Pic, 1944
 Falsomesosella unicolor Breuning, 1969

subgenus Pseudomesosella
 Falsomesosella saigonensis Breuning, 1938

References

 
Mesosini